Nathan Sinkala (born 22 November 1990) is a Zambian professional footballer who plays as a defensive midfielder for South African side Stellenbosch and the Zambia national team.

Club career

Green Buffaloes
Born in Chingola, Sinkala began his career in 2008 with Green Buffaloes, and spent a loan spell in Israel with Hapoel Kiryat Shmona during 2009, playing for their reserve team. At Green Buffaloes, Sinkala scored three leagues goal during the 2009 season, and two league goals during the 2010 season. He also won the Zambian Charity Shield in 2010.

TP Mazembe and loans
After participating at the 2012 Africa Cup of Nations, Sinkala signed for TP Mazembe on a three-year deal.

On 8 January 2014, Sinkala joined French Ligue 1 side Sochaux-Montbéliard on a loan deal. He later stated that he wished to remain with the club following the end of the loan deal. On 7 July 2014, Sinkala was loaned again from Mazembe, this time to Swiss Super League side Grasshopper Club Zürich.

Stellenbosch
In January 2020, he moved to Stellenbosch.

International career
Sinkala made his international debut for Zambia in 2011, and participated at the 2012 Africa Cup of Nations. He was called up to Zambia's 23-man squad for the 2013 Africa Cup of Nations.

In October 2013, due to a disagreement between their club TP Mazembe and the Zambian Football Association over international call-ups, Sinkala and two other players (Rainford Kalaba and Stoppila Sunzu) were the subject of a Zambian arrest warrant. All three players later had their passports confiscated by Zambian immigration authorities, before being pardoned by the Zambian government.

In December 2014 he was named as part of Zambia's preliminary squad for the 2015 Africa Cup of Nations. He was injured in his country's opening game in the tournament.

Personal life
He is the younger brother of Andrew Sinkala.

Career statistics
Scores and results list Zambia's goal tally first, score column indicates score after each Sinkala goal.

References

1990 births
Living people
People from Chingola
Association football midfielders
Zambian footballers
Zambia international footballers
Ligue 2 players
Swiss Super League players
Green Buffaloes F.C. players
TP Mazembe players
FC Sochaux-Montbéliard players
Grasshopper Club Zürich players
Stellenbosch F.C. players
Africa Cup of Nations-winning players
2012 Africa Cup of Nations players
2013 Africa Cup of Nations players
2015 Africa Cup of Nations players
Zambian expatriate footballers
Zambian expatriate sportspeople in Israel
Expatriate footballers in Israel
Zambian expatriate sportspeople in the Democratic Republic of the Congo
Expatriate footballers in the Democratic Republic of the Congo
Zambian expatriate sportspeople in France
Expatriate footballers in France
Zambian expatriate sportspeople in Switzerland
Expatriate footballers in Switzerland
Zambian expatriates in South Africa
Expatriate soccer players in South Africa